MR-20 is a Russian (Former Soviet Union) sounding rocket, and is a type of meteorological rocket. It was followed by the MR-30.

Launching experiments
In 1985, an MR-20 mclcorological rocket was used from the North Atlantic in a Soviet-Polish experiment adapting an ion gun to inject lithium ions into the ionosphere.

In September 1988, 3 MR-20 rocket experiments with artificial "electron hole" formations took place  in the Northern Auroral Zone on the research vessel named "Professor Vize". The launchings of MR-20 rockets were to examine the upper atmospheric and ionospheric characteristics in the Auroral.

References

External links
Article title
Article title

Sounding rockets of the Soviet Union
Meteorology in the Soviet Union